FK Željezničar's 2011–12 season was their 14th successive season in the Premier League of Bosnia and Herzegovina which saw Željezničar win the league title for the 5th time.

The 2011–12 season was ultimately very successful for the club as they won the Bosnian "double," winning the title and the Bosnian cup over NK Široki Brijeg. It was one of the best seasons in the club's history, including setting the league record for points with three games to play, having an over 30-game undefeated streak, and defeating every other team in the league at least once except Zrijnski, whom they drew with twice.

During the season, the club also started publishing an official club magazine.

Statistics 2011–12

Squad information

  

Total squad cost: €6,800,000

From the youth system

Disciplinary record
Includes all competitive matches. The list is sorted by position, and then shirt number.

Transfers

In 

Total expenditure:

Out 

 
Total income:  €825,000

Competitions

Pre-season

Mid-season

Overall

League table

Results summary

Results by round

Matches
Željezničar's eighth-round match against Borac was abandoned after Borac supporters invaded the pitch and threw stones at Željezničar supporters, immediately after Željezničar had opened the scoring. The match was ultimately abandoned and awarded to Željezničar.

Željezničar had a 26-game undefeated streak in the league only broken by Leotar on the 30th and final round of the season. Željezničar had clinched the title at this point, while Leotar needed to win to avoid relegation.

Kup Bosne i Hercegovine

Round of 32

Round of 16

Quarter-finals

Semi-finals

Final

UEFA Europa League
Though they won the domestic double, Željezničar was not successful in Europe, only winning one round against Sheriff Tiraspol. After going down 2–0 to Maccabi Tel Aviv at home, Željezničar was demolished 6–0 in the return leg after conceding two late consolation goals, including an own goal by the goalkeeper.

Second qualifying round

Third qualifying round

References

FK Željezničar Sarajevo seasons
Zeljeznicar